William Bankhead Moskiman (December 20, 1879 – January 11, 1953) was a first baseman and right fielder in Major League Baseball who played briefly for the Boston Red Sox in its 1910 season. (77 kg), he batted and threw right-handed.

Born in Oakland, California, Moskiman attended Jefferson Grammar School for eight years, and graduated from Oakland High School. Afterwards, he was a medical student at Cooper Medical College but never truly became a doctor because he chose to play ball instead.

Moskiman spent parts of 13 seasons playing minor-league and independent-league ball, pitching more often than not and obtaining considerably good results in the California League, where he posted a 31-13 record in 1909 for the Oakland Commuters. Previously, he won 29 games for Oakland in 1901 and 22 for the Stockton Millers in 1908.

As a result, newspapers like the Los Angeles Times bestowed his degree on him in advance by frequently referring to him as 'Doctor Moskiman', or simply 'Doc', a nickname given to a player to be wise, e.g., Doc Moskiman, who gave far more analysis to his pitching than most other pitchers.

In five major-league games with the Red Sox, Moskiman was a .111 hitter (1-for-9) with one run scored and one run batted in. He made no errors in 18 fielding chances.

After his playing days, Moskiman worked as a traveling salesman for the sporting goods manufacturer A. G. Spalding & Bros. and later was the retail manager of an athletic-goods store.

In between, Moskiman was a long time resident of San Leandro, California, where he died in 1953 at the age of 73.

Sources

External links
, or Retrosheet, or SABR Biography Project

1879 births
1953 deaths
Baseball players from Oakland, California
Boston Red Sox players
Jersey City Skeeters players
Louisville Colonels (minor league) players
Major League Baseball first basemen
Major League Baseball right fielders
Oakland Commuters players
Oakland Oaks (baseball) players
Oakland Reliance players
San Francisco Seals (baseball) players
Stockton (minor league baseball) players
Stockton Millers players